New Camp Carleton was a Union Army garrison of the District of Southern California during the American Civil War.  It was established on March 22, 1862, near El Monte, California.  It was located "on the right bank of the San Gabriel River, four miles north east from El Monte, the nearest post office, and which is distant thirteen miles from Los Angeles."  The garrison was transferred there from San Bernardino because it was in a better location to supply the camp, and also to oversee the area which was a hotbed of secessionist sympathizers.  The camp was closed in 1865.

See also
California in the Civil War

References

Closed installations of the United States Army
1862 establishments in California
History of Los Angeles County, California
California in the American Civil War
New Camp Carleton
El Monte, California